FC Gefest is a Kazakhstani football club based in Karagandy.

History
The club was formed in 2008. In 2009 the team debuted in Kazakhstan First Division and finished 9th in its first ever professional season. In 2010 the team gaming on stadium Sunkar which is located in Saran, Kazakhstan, near 30 km Karagandy. In 2012 the club did not start in any professional league.

League results

References
The official site
The team's squad in 2011

Association football clubs established in 2008
Football clubs in Kazakhstan
2008 establishments in Kazakhstan
Sport in Karaganda